During World War II, the Lapland War saw fighting between Finland and Nazi Germany – effectively from September to November 1944 – in Finland's northernmost region, Lapland. Though the Finns and the Germans had been fighting against the Soviet Union since 1941 during the Continuation War (1941–1944), peace negotiations had already been conducted intermittently during 1943–1944 between Finland, the Western Allies and the USSR, but no agreement had been reached. The Moscow Armistice, signed on 19 September 1944, demanded that Finland break diplomatic ties with Germany and expel or disarm any German soldiers remaining in Finland after 15 September 1944.

The Wehrmacht had anticipated that turn of events and planned an organised  withdrawal to German-occupied Norway, as part of Operation Birke (Birch). Despite a failed offensive landing operation by Germany in the Gulf of Finland, the evacuation proceeded peacefully at first. The Finns escalated the situation into warfare on 28 September after Soviet pressure to adhere to the terms of the armistice. The Finnish Army was required by the Soviet Union to demobilise and to pursue German troops out of Finnish soil. After a series of minor battles, the war came to an effective end in November 1944, when German troops had reached Norway or its vicinity and took fortified positions. The last German soldiers left Finland on 27 April 1945, shortly before the end of World War II in Europe.

The Finns considered the war a separate conflict because hostilities with other nations had ceased after the Continuation War. From the German perspective, it was a part of the two campaigns to evacuate from northern Finland and northern Norway. Soviet involvement in the war amounted to monitoring Finnish operations, minor air support and entering northeastern Lapland during the Petsamo–Kirkenes Offensive. The military impact was relatively limited with both sides sustaining around 4,000 in total casualties although the Germans' delaying scorched earth and land mine strategies devastated Finnish Lapland. The  successfully withdrew, and Finland upheld its obligations under the Moscow Armistice, but it remained formally at war with the Soviet Union and the United Kingdom until ratification of the 1947 Paris Peace Treaty.

Prelude
Germany and Finland had been at war with the Soviet Union (USSR) since Operation Barbarossa began in June 1941, co-operating closely in the Continuation War and Operation Silver Fox with the German 20th Mountain Army stationed in Lapland. As early as the summer of 1943, the German high command Oberkommando der Wehrmacht began to plan for the eventuality that Finland might negotiate a separate peace agreement with the Soviet Union. The Germans planned to withdraw their forces northward in order to shield the nickel mines near Petsamo. During the winter of 1943–1944, the Germans improved the roads from northern Norway to northern Finland by extensive use of prisoner-of-war labour in certain areas. Casualties among the labouring prisoners were high, in part because many of them had been captured in southern Europe and were still in summer uniform. In addition, the Germans surveyed defensive positions and planned to evacuate as much materiel as possible from the region, and meticulously prepared for withdrawal. On 9 April 1944, the German withdrawal plan was designated as Operation Birke. In June 1944, the Germans started to construct fortifications against a possible enemy advance from the south. The accidental death of  Eduard Dietl on 23 June 1944 brought  Lothar Rendulic to the command of the 20th Mountain Army.

After the Soviet strategic Vyborg–Petrozavodsk Offensive in southern Finland from June to July and a change in Finnish leadership in August 1944, Finland negotiated a separate peace agreement with the USSR. The ceasefire agreement required the Finns to break diplomatic ties with Germany and publicly demand the withdrawal of all German troops from Finland by 15 September 1944. Any troops remaining after the deadline were to be expelled or disarmed and handed over to the USSR. Even with the German withdrawal operation, the Finns estimated it would take three months for the Wehrmacht to fully evacuate. The task was further complicated by the Soviet demand that the majority of the Finnish Defence Forces be demobilised while conducting a military campaign against the Germans. Before deciding to accept the Soviet demands, President Carl Gustaf Emil Mannerheim, former Finnish commander-in-chief, wrote a letter directly to Adolf Hitler:

Order of battle

German
The 20th Mountain Army had been fighting the Soviet Karelian Front since Operation Barbarossa along the  stretch from the Oulu River to the Arctic Ocean. It now comprised 214,000 soldiers, a considerable amount of them under SS formations, led by  Rendulic. The number of active troops decreased quickly as they withdrew to Norway. The army was positioned as follows:
 XIX Mountain Corps in the far-northern Petsamo area beside the Arctic Ocean.
 XXXVI Mountain Corps in the area of Salla and Alakurtti, eastern Lapland.
 XVIII Mountain Corps was in charge of the southern flank at Kestenga and Uhtua.

Finnish
The III Corps led by Lieutenant General Hjalmar Siilasvuo gradually shifted from the defence of the Vyborg–Petrozavodsk Offensive to the latitude of Oulu and was fully repositioned by 28 September. The III Corps consisted of the 3rd, 6th and 11th Divisions as well as the Armoured Division. Additionally, four battalions formerly under German command were converted into separate detachments. Two regiments, Infantry Regiment 15 and Border Jaeger Regiment, reinforced the III Corps. In total, Finnish ground forces in the Lapland theatre were 75,000 strong. The number of Finnish troops dropped sharply as the Germans withdrew and the Finnish Army was demobilised; by December 1944 only 12,000 were left. Due to this, the Finnish soldiers were mostly conscripts, as veterans were transferred away from the front. The latter part of the war was therefore dubbed the "Children's Crusade" in Finland.

Phases of the war

Evacuation and naval operations in September
The announcement on 2 September 1944 of the ceasefire and the Moscow Armistice between Finland and the USSR triggered frantic efforts by the 20th Mountain Army, which immediately started Operation Birke. Large amounts of materiel were evacuated from southern Finland and harsh punishments were set for any hindering of the withdrawal. The Germans began to seize Finnish shipping. Finland responded by denying ships to sail from Finland to Germany and nearly doomed the materiel evacuations of Operation Birke. So the order was rescinded and then the Finns, in turn, allowed Finnish tonnage to be used to hasten the German evacuations. The first German naval mines were laid in Finnish seaways on 14 September 1944, allegedly for use against Soviet shipping, though since Finland and Germany were not yet in open conflict, the Germans warned the Finns of their intent.

As the Finns wanted to avoid devastation of their country, and the Germans wished to avoid hostilities, both sides strove for the evacuation to be performed as smoothly as possible. By 15 September, a secret agreement had been reached by which the Germans would inform the Finns of their withdrawal timetable, who would then allow the Germans to use Finnish transportation for evacuation as well as to destroy roads, railroads and bridges behind their withdrawal. In practice, friction soon arose both from the destruction caused by the Germans and from the pressure exerted on the Finns by the Soviets.

On 15 September 1944, the Kriegsmarine tried to land and seize the island of Suursaari in Operation Tanne Ost to secure shipping routes in the Gulf of Finland. The USSR sent aircraft to support the Finnish defenders and the  failed to capture Suursaari. After the landing attempt, a Finnish coastal artillery fort at Utö island prevented German net-laying ships from passing into the Baltic Sea on 15 September, as they had been ordered to intern the German forces. On 16 September, a German naval detachment consisting of the  escorted by five destroyers arrived at Utö. The German cruiser stayed out of range of the Finnish  guns and threatened to open fire with its artillery. In order to avoid bloodshed, the Finns allowed the net-layers to pass. In response to the German operations, Finland immediately removed its shipping from the joint evacuation operation, but the evacuation from Lapland to Norway progressed according to the secret agreement. The last German convoy departed from Kemi in northern Finland on 21 September 1944 and was escorted by submarines and, starting from south of Åland, by German cruisers.

Initial land battles in September and October

The lack of Finnish aggression did not go unnoticed by the Allied Control Commission monitoring adherence to the Moscow Armistice and the USSR threatened to occupy Finland if the terms of expelling or disarming the Germans were not met. Thus, Lieutenant General Siilasvuo ordered the III Corps to engage. This took the Germans by surprise as the Finns had previously agreed to warn them should they be forced to take hostile action against them. After the incident, partial contact was re-established. The Germans told the Finns they had no interest in fighting them, but would not surrender. The next incident took place on 29 September at a bridge crossing the Olhava river between Kemi and Oulu. Finnish troops, who had been ordered to take the bridge intact, were attempting to disarm explosives rigged to the bridge when the Germans detonated them, demolishing the bridge and killing, among others, the Finnish company commander. On 30 September, the Finns attempted to encircle the Germans at Pudasjärvi into a pocket (called a motti in Finnish, originally meaning  of firewood) with flanking movements through the forests and managed to cut the road leading north. By then, however, the bulk of the German force at Pudasjärvi had already left, leaving behind only a small detachment which, after warning the Finns, blew up a munitions dump.

The risky landings for the Battle of Tornio, on the border with Sweden next to the Gulf of Bothnia, began on 30 September 1944 when three Finnish transport ships (SS Norma, SS Fritz S and SS Hesperus) departed from Oulu towards Tornio without any air or naval escorts. They arrived on 1 October and disembarked their troops without any interference. The landing had originally been planned as a diversionary raid, with the main assault to take place at Kemi, where the Finnish battalion-sized Detachment Pennanen was already in control of important industrial facilities on the island of Ajos. Various factors—including a stronger than expected German garrison at Kemi already alerted by local attacks—made the Finns switch the target to Röyttä, Tornio's outer port. The Finns initially landed the Infantry Regiment 11 of the 3rd Division, which, together with a Civil Guard-led uprising at Tornio, managed to secure both the port and most of the town as well as the bridges over the Tornio River. The Finnish attack soon bogged down due to disorganisation caused in part by alcohol looted from German supply depots as well as stiffening German resistance. During the ensuing battle, the German , a reinforced regiment, conducted several counterattacks to retake the town as it formed an important transportation link between the two roads running parallel to the Kemi and Tornio Rivers. As ordered by  Rendulic, the Germans took 262 Finnish civilian hostages in an attempt to trade them for captured soldiers. The Finns refused and the civilians were later released on 12 October.

A second wave of four Finnish ships arrived on 2 October and a third wave—three ships strong and with Brewster F2A fighter escorts—landed its troops with only a single ship being lightly damaged by German Stuka dive bombers. On 4 October, bad weather prevented Finnish air cover from reaching Tornio, leaving the fourth landing wave vulnerable.  bombers scored several hits and sank the SS Bore IX and the SS Maininki alongside the pier. The fifth wave on 5 October suffered only light shrapnel damage despite being both shelled from shore and bombed from the sky. The Finnish Navy's gunboats ,   and VMV-class patrol boats 15 and 16 arrived with the sixth wave just in time to witness German Focke-Wulf Fw 200 Condor bombers attacking the shipping at Tornio with Henschel Hs 293 glide bombs without results. Arrival of naval assets allowed the Finns to safely disembark heavy equipment to support the battle and around 12,500 soldiers in total arrived during the landings. The Finnish Infantry Regiment 11 was reinforced with Infantry Regiments 50 and 53. The Finns beat back German counterattacks for a week until 8 October, when the Germans withdrew from Tornio.
Meanwhile, Finnish troops were advancing overland from Oulu towards Kemi, with the 15th Brigade making only slow progress against meager German resistance. Their advance was hampered by the destruction of roads and bridges by withdrawing Germans as well as a lack of spirit in both the Finnish troops and their leaders. Strong German resistance, civilians in the area, and looted alcohol prevented the Finns from fully trapping all the Germans. Though Finnish forces took several hundred prisoners, they failed to prevent the Germans from demolishing the bridges over the Kemi River once they began to withdraw on 8 October.

From the start of the war, the Germans had systematically destroyed and mined the roads and bridges as they withdrew in a delaying strategy. After the first hostilities took place,  Rendulic issued several orders on destroying Finnish property in Lapland. On 6 October, a strict order was issued which classified only military sites or military necessities as targets. On 8 October, the Germans bombed and heavily damaged factory areas of Kemi. On 9 October, the demolition order was extended to include all governmental buildings with the exception of hospitals. On 13 October, "all covers, installations and objects that can be used by an enemy" were ordered to be destroyed in northern Finland in a scorched-earth strategy. Though it was logical for the Germans to deny pursuing forces any shelter, it had a very limited effect on the Finns, who always carried tents for shelter.

German withdrawal effective by November

When Allied advances continued, German high command  and 20th Mountain Army leadership asserted that it would be perilous to maintain positions in Lapland and east of Lyngen municipality in northern Norway. Likewise, Minister of Armaments and War Production Albert Speer had determined that German nickel stores were sufficient and holding Petsamo was unnecessary. Preparations for further withdrawal began. Hitler accepted the proposal on 4 October 1944, and the plan was codenamed Operation Nordlicht on 6 October. Instead of a gradual withdrawal from southern Lapland into fortified positions further to the north while evacuating materiel, as in Operation Birke, Operation Nordlicht called for a rapid and strictly organised withdrawal directly behind Lyngen Fjord in Norway, while under pressure from harassing enemy forces. As the Germans withdrew towards the town of Rovaniemi, a road junction point in Lapland, and Norway, movement was mostly limited to the immediate vicinity of Lapland's three main roads, which constricted military activities considerably. In general, the withdrawal followed a pattern in which advancing Finnish units would encounter German rear guards and attempt to flank them on foot, but the destroyed road network prevented them from bringing up artillery and other heavy weapons. As Finnish infantry slowly picked their way through the dense woods and marshland, the motorised German units would simply drive away and take up positions further down the road.

The opposing forces were roughly even numerically and the lack of heavy weapons and exhaustion from long marches prevented the Finnish brigade from trapping the defending Germans before it received permission to withdraw on 9 October after causing substantial losses to the Finns. The German withdrawal allowed the Finns to surround one of the delaying battalions, but Mountain Regiment 218 returned and managed to rescue the stranded battalion. The Germans initially concentrated on destroying governmental buildings in Rovaniemi, but the fire spread and destroyed housing beyond that. German attempts to fight the fire failed and a train loaded with ammunition caught fire at the railroad station on 14 October, resulting in an explosion which spread the fire throughout the primarily wooden buildings of the town. The first Finnish units to reach the vicinity of Rovaniemi on 14 October were components of the Jaeger Brigade advancing from Ranua. The Germans repelled Finnish attempts to capture the last intact bridge over the Kemi river and then left the mostly scorched town to the Finns on 16 October 1944.Finnish demobilisation and difficult supply routes took their toll. Finnish forces gained ground only on 1 November, when the Germans withdrew northward. This prevented the Finnish 11th Division from gaining the upper hand despite initially fairly successful flanking operations by Infantry Regiments 8 and 50.

The Soviet Karelian Front, led by General Kirill Meretskov, initiated its Petsamo–Kirkenes Offensive and started to push the XIX Mountain Corps towards Norway from Soviet territory along the Arctic coast on 7 October. By 25 October, the front captured the Norwegian port of Kirkenes. The 14th Army pursued German troops withdrawing southwest from Petsamo and Kirkenes approximately  into Finnish territory along Lake Inari. By 5 November, Soviet reconnaissance troops met with the Finnish Army at Ivalo. The Soviet troops in Ivalo did not leave until September 1945.

For most practical purposes, the war in Lapland concluded in early November 1944. After holding Tankavaara, the Germans swiftly withdrew from north-eastern Lapland at Karigasniemi on 25 November 1944. The Finnish Jaeger Brigade pursuing them had by then been mostly demobilised. In north-western Lapland, only four battalions of Finnish troops were left on 4 November and by February 1945, a mere 600 men. The Germans continued their withdrawal but remained in positions first at Palojoensuu village,  from Norway, in early November 1944. From there, they moved to the fortified  position along the Lätäseno River,  from Norway, on 26 November. The German 7th Mountain Division held these positions until 10 January 1945 when northern Norway had been cleared and positions at Lyngen Fjord were manned. Some German positions defending Lyngen extended over to Kilpisjärvi on the Finnish side of the border, but no major activity occurred. The  completely withdrew from Finland by 27 April 1945 and a Finnish battle patrol raised the flag on the three-country cairn between Norway, Sweden and Finland to celebrate the end of the wars.

There was never an official peace agreement signed between Finland and Germany. It was not until 1954 that the government of Finland officially noted that "the hostilities have ceased and interaction between Finland and Germany since then developed peacefully" and thus "the war has ended".

Aftermath

The 20th Mountain Army successfully withdrew most of its over 200,000 men as well as supplies and equipment from Lapland to continue defending occupied Finnmark from the USSR. According to American historian Earl F. Ziemke, "it had no parallel" as an evacuation across the Arctic in winter. The casualties of the conflict were relatively limited: 774 killed, 262 missing and around 2,904 wounded Finns. Germany experienced around 1,000 deaths and 2,000 wounded. 1,300 German soldiers became prisoners of war and were handed over to the USSR according to the terms of the armistice. The German delaying operations left Lapland devastated. In addition to 3,100 buildings demolished elsewhere in Finland, estimates of destroyed infrastructure in Lapland are as follows:
 14,900 buildings representing around 40–46 percent of Lapland's property;
  of railway;
  of road;
 675 bridges;
 2,800 road storm drains;
  of phone and telegram lines.
The reconstruction of Lapland lasted until the early 1950s, although the railway network was not functional until 1957. In addition to the demolished infrastructure, the  extensively laid mines and explosives in the area. By 1973, over 800,000 cartridges, 70,000 mines and 400,000 other explosives had been demined in Lapland, a total of 1,142,000 units.

In popular culture
The 2011 novel The Midwife by Katja Kettu is based on the war, on the basis of which Antti Jokinen made the film Wildeye in 2015.

The Cuckoo is a 2002 Russian historical comedy drama film directed by Aleksandr Rogozhkin. The film takes place in Lapland during the final phases of Continuation War directly leading to the Lapland War, taking the perspective of opposing Soviet and Finnish soldiers stranded at a Sámi woman's farmhouse. "Kukushka" was the nickname given by Soviet soldiers to Finnish cuckoo snipers, who ambushed their targets from a purpose-built tree-branch-nest.

The 2022 Finnish action film Sisu, directed by Jalmari Helander, is set during the Lapland War.

See also

 Aarne Juutilainen
 Arctic naval operations of World War II
 Cold-weather warfare
 Fell
 Gebirgsjäger
 Lapplandsender
 Military history of Finland during World War II

Notes

References

Citations

Bibliography

Finnish

English

Further reading
 
  PDF

External links

Finna (search service for information from Finnish archives, libraries and museums)
Finnish Wartime Photograph Archive (under CC BY 4.0)

Arctic military operations of World War II
Eastern European theatre of World War II
Finland in World War II
Wars involving Finland
Wars involving Germany
War
History of the Arctic
1944 in Finland
1945 in Finland
1944 in Germany
1945 in Germany